John Forrosuelo Du, D.D. (born October 18, 1954 in Bantayan, Cebu), is a prelate of the Roman Catholic Church in the Philippines.  He is the Archbishop of Palo in Leyte, Philippines. He was appointed to a previously vacant see left by the elevation of archbishop Jose S. Palma to the Archdiocese of Cebu.

Biography
John Du was appointed Bishop of Timici. He was ordained priest of Cebu, Philippines on June 1, 1979, after obtaining degrees in philosophy and theology from the San Carlos Seminary College in Cebu and the Divine Word Seminary in Tagaytay City.

In 1997, Pope John Paul II appointed him Auxiliary Bishop of Cebu. He was named Bishop of Dumaguete on April 21, 2001. In 2012 he was CBCP treasurer and chair of the CBCP Pension Plan. The Archdiocese of Palo had 1.2 million Catholics as of 2004 and its suffragan dioceses include Borongan, Calbayog, Catarman and Naval.

Archbishop of Palo
On February 25, 2012, Pope Benedict XVI elevated Du to Archbishop of Palo in succession to Jose S. Palma.

References

External links
Profile, catholic-hierarchy.org; accessed 20 September 2016.

1954 births
People from Cebu
People from Leyte (province)
21st-century Roman Catholic archbishops in the Philippines
Living people
Roman Catholic archbishops of Palo